Saint-Pair-sur-Mer (literally Saint-Pair on Sea) is a commune in the Manche department in Normandy in north-western France.

See also
Communes of the Manche department

References

External links

Official Web site

Saintpairsurmer